The Undefeated is a 1969 American Western and Civil War-era film directed by Andrew V. McLaglen and starring John Wayne and Rock Hudson. 
The film portrays events surrounding the French Imperial intervention in Mexico during the 1860s period of the neighboring American Civil War. It is also loosely based on Confederate States Army General Joseph Orville Shelby's factual escape to Mexico after the American Civil War (1861–1865), and his attempt to join with Maximilian's Imperial Mexican forces.

Plot
In the closing days of the American Civil War, Union Army Colonel John Henry Thomas and company  organize one final attack on a small unit of Confederate soldiers, only to be informed after bloodily defeating them that the war had ended three days ago at Appomattox Courthouse in Virginia. Saddened and weary, Thomas leads his men out west towards home with the intention of rounding up and selling wild horses in the Arizona and New Mexico Territories to compensate them for their loyalty, friendship, and war service.

Meanwhile, some Confederate States Army soldiers led by Colonel James Langdon feel the war has left them with no home, and they prepare to emigrate south to Mexico and serve as reinforcements to Emperor Maximilian, leader of the French intervention invasion of Mexico against the republican government of President Benito Juárez. Langdon torches his plantation home before he departs rather than seeing it fall into the hands of Northern carpetbaggers. At the same time, Thomas and the surviving members of his command meet up with Thomas' adopted Indian son, Blue Boy, and other members of his tribe from the Oklahoma and Indian Territories.  Together, they round up a herd of 3,000 horses and take them across the Rio Grande of the North for sale to Maximilian's representatives in Durango, Mexico.

Halfway there, Blue Boy discovers tracks indicating that Mexican Comanchero bandits are planning an ambush on the group of Confederate travelers. Blue Boy and Thomas go to warn the emigrating Confederates and Thomas and Langdon meet. Despite their differences, the Americans - Northerners, Southerners, and Cherokee Indians - repel the group of Mexican bandidos attacking the Confederate camp, with Thomas' former Union Army troopers saving the day. Col. Langdon thanks the Northerners by inviting them to celebrate at a Fourth of July party - "Southern style". However, the former soldiers soon relive the war when a fight breaks out. They then split and go their separate ways. Meanwhile, Langdon's daughter Charlotte and Blue Boy have quickly fallen in love.

When Langdon's Southern company finally reaches their destination in Durango, they find that Emperor Maximilian's forces had been chased out days earlier, replaced by ragged Mexican Republican forces of President Juárez, under General Rojas, who imprisons them. Viewing the new foreigners as potential enemies, the Juarista general holds the Southerners hostage, offering to release them in exchange for Thomas' horses. After Langdon is sent to Thomas' camp with Rojas' demands, the reluctant American cowboys agree to pay the ransom to free their brethren. On the way to Durango, Thomas and his men are confronted by French cavalry. A battle erupts with the Americans coming out victorious. Thomas and his men bring the horses to town and pay the ransom for their former enemies.

The company of reunited Americans rides out of Durango to return to the U.S.A. Trying to decide what song to listen to as they ride, the group passes over "Dixie" and "Battle Hymn of the Republic" before settling on "Yankee Doodle". Charlotte and Blue Boy are seen as a couple, while both Thomas and Langdon laugh at how the Confederate colonel's daughter has cut Blue Boy's hair.

Cast
 John Wayne as Colonel John Henry Thomas
 Rock Hudson as Colonel James Langdon
 Tony Aguilar as General Rojas
 Roman Gabriel as Blue Boy
 Marian McCargo as Ann
 Lee Meriwether as Margaret 
 Merlin Olsen as George 'Little George'
 Melissa Newman as Charlotte 
 Bruce Cabot as Confederate Sergeant Jeff Newby
 Michael Vincent as Lieutenant Bubba Wilkes
 Ben Johnson as 'Short' Grub
 Edward Faulkner as Anderson
 Harry Carey Jr. as Webster
 Paul Fix as General Joe Masters
 Royal Dano as Major Sanders
 Richard Mulligan as Dan Morse
 Carlos Rivas as Diaz
 John Agar as Christian
 Guy Raymond as Giles
 Don Collier as Goodyear
 Big John Hamilton as Mudlow
 Dub Taylor as McCartney
 Henry Beckman as Thad Benedict
 Víctor Junco as Major Tapia
 Robert Donner as Judd Mailer
 Pedro Armendariz Jr. as Escalante
 James Dobson as Jamison
 Rudy Diaz as Sanchez 
 Richard Angarola as Petain
 James McEachin as Jimmy Collins
 Gregg Palmer as Parker 
 Juan García as Colonel Gomez
 Kiel Martin as Union Runner 
 Bob Gravage as Joe Hicks

Production 

The original script was by Stanley Hough and Casey Robinson, neither of whom is credited in the final film. Producer Robert Jacks bought it in December 1967, announcing James Lee Barrett would do the final script.

In May 1968, Jacks announced the film would be made through 20th Century Fox. Andrew McLaglen signed to direct as the first of a two-picture deal with Fox. In August 1968 John Wayne agreed to star. The following month, Rock Hudson signed to co-star.

The stunt coordinator was Hal Needham, later a film director.

According to Rock Hudson's lover Marc Christian, John Wayne started out picking on Hudson during filming, but the two men became friends. In Mark Griffin's biography of Hudson, All that Heaven Allows, Wayne is shown to have initially started to "direct" Hudson, constantly suggesting what he should do on camera. When Hudson began to do the same to Wayne, Wayne pointed his finger at Hudson and said, "I like you." The suggestions stopped, and the two men became frequent partners in chess and bridge.

Filming took place in Sierra de Órganos National Park, near the town of Sombrerete, Zacatecas, Mexico.

Reception
The film earned $4.5 million in rentals in North America.

According to Fox records, the film required $12,425,000 in rentals to break even, but by December 11, 1970, the film had made only $8,775,000, which resulted in a loss for the studio.

See also
 List of American films of 1969
 John Wayne filmography
 O'Flaherty, Daniel C. General Jo Shelby: Undefeated Rebel, University of North Carolina Press, 1954; ; republished, 2000.
 The Shadow Riders

References

External links
 
 
 
 

1969 films
1969 Western (genre) films
1960s English-language films
1960s historical adventure films
20th Century Fox films
American Civil War films
American historical adventure films
American Western (genre) films
Films directed by Andrew McLaglen
Films scored by Hugo Montenegro
Second French intervention in Mexico films
1960s American films